Egon Meldgaard Hansen (born 13 April 1931) is a Danish former sports shooter. He competed in the trap event at the 1972 Summer Olympics.

References

External links 
 

1931 births
Possibly living people
Danish male sport shooters
Olympic shooters of Denmark
Shooters at the 1972 Summer Olympics
People from Ringkøbing-Skjern Municipality
Sportspeople from the Central Denmark Region